Rubus ursinus is a North American species of blackberry or dewberry, known by the common names California blackberry, California dewberry, Douglas berry, Pacific blackberry, Pacific dewberry and trailing blackberry.

Description
The prickly branches can take root if they touch soil, thus enabling the plant to spread vegetatively and form larger clonal colonies.

The leaves usually have 3 leaflets but sometimes 5 or only 1, and are deciduous. The plant is dioecious, with male and female plants on separate plants, also unusual for the genus. As with other Rubus, the canes are typically vegetative the first year, and reproductive in the second.

The flowers are white with narrower petals than most related species, and have a fragrance.

Taxonomy

Subspecies and varieties
Current or recent subspecies and varieties include:
Rubus ursinus subsp. macropetalus — all of distribution range
Rubus ursinus subsp. ursinus — California and Oregon
Rubus ursinus var. sirbenus — endemic to California
Rubus ursinus var. ursinus — California and Oregon

Cultivars
A cultivar of this species named the 'Aughinbaugh' blackberry was a parent of the loganberry. R. ursinus is also a second-generation parent of the boysenberry and the marionberry, or 'Marion' blackberry.

'Wild Treasure' has the fruit size and flavor of the wild species, but without prickles, and the berries are machine harvestable. It was released by the U.S. Department of Agriculture's Agricultural Research Service in 2010, and is a hybrid between a selection of R. ursinus and 'Waldo' (another cultivar that is a second-generation descendant of the marionberry that has no prickles).

Etymology
The name is from rubus for "bramble" and ursinus for "bear".

Distribution
The plant is native to western North America, found in British Columbia (Canada); California, Idaho, Montana, Oregon, and Washington (Western U.S.); and Baja California state (Mexico).

Cultivation

The plant is cultivated for its fruit, and also ornamental plant qualities.  It is planted in home, native plant, and wildlife gardens, and in natural landscaping projects. It can be espaliered or trained on fences and trellising. When mature/established, the plant is effective in stabilizing creek banks and edges of bioswales.

To set large fruit, the plant needs consistent amounts of moisture. Otherwise it is moderately drought tolerant when established. Seed size seems to be related to fruit "cell" size, and the smallest fully formed berries (about ) are most highly prized. These are sometimes called "little wild blackberries".

Uses
Diverse wildlife eat the berries, including songbirds, deer, bear, and other large and small mammals. It is of notable pollinator and nesting material value for native bee and bumble bee species. This blackberry species is a larval food source for Papilio rutulus (the western tiger swallowtail butterfly), Nymphalis antiopa (the mourning cloak butterfly), Strymon melinus (the gray hairstreak butterfly), and Celastrina ladon (the spring azure butterfly).

Native Americans such as the Kumeyaay, Maidu, Pomo and Salish peoples used R. ursinus as a fresh and dried fruit source and as a traditional medicinal plant.  The Concow tribe calls this plant wân-kö-mil′-ē in the Konkow language.

References

External links

 
 
 
 
Jepson Manual eFlora (TJM2) treatment of Rubus ursinus
University of Washington, Burkey Museum herbarium image collection — photos, description, Washington distribution map.
Northwest Oregon Wetland Plants Project, Rubus ursinus - Trailing blackberry; Dewberry; Pacific blackberry 

ursinus
Berries
Flora of California
Flora of Baja California
Flora of British Columbia
Flora of the Northwestern United States
Flora of the Cascade Range
Flora of the Sierra Nevada (United States)
Fruits originating in North America
Plants used in Native American cuisine
Plants used in traditional Native American medicine
Plants described in 1827
Natural history of the California chaparral and woodlands
Natural history of the California Coast Ranges
Natural history of the Central Valley (California)
Natural history of the Channel Islands of California
Natural history of the Peninsular Ranges
Natural history of the San Francisco Bay Area
Natural history of the Santa Monica Mountains
Natural history of the Transverse Ranges
Bird food plants
Butterfly food plants
Garden plants of North America
Flora without expected TNC conservation status